Vlastimil Lakosil (born July 4, 1979) is a Czech ice hockey goaltender. He is currently playing with the Hull Pirates of the English Premier Ice Hockey League (EPIHL).

Lakosil made his Czech Extraliga debut with HC Oceláři Třinec during the 1997–98 Czech Extraliga season. He played parts of seven seasons in Třinec. Lakosil then spent the next seven years in the Slovak Extraliga with HK Nitra, Skalica HK 36, and Ceske Budejovice HC.

References

External links

1979 births
Living people
Czech ice hockey goaltenders
HC Oceláři Třinec players
Dundee Stars players
People from Uherské Hradiště
Sportspeople from the Zlín Region
Czech expatriate sportspeople in England
Czech expatriate sportspeople in Scotland
Expatriate ice hockey players in Scotland
Expatriate ice hockey players in England
Czech expatriate ice hockey players in Slovakia
Czech expatriate ice hockey players in Germany
Czech expatriate sportspeople in Kazakhstan
Czech expatriate sportspeople in Romania
Expatriate ice hockey players in Romania
Expatriate ice hockey players in Kazakhstan